The Crab Claw is an independently-owned restaurant located in St. Michaels, Maryland..Initially a clam-shucking business in the 1950s, the establishment expanded to include a seafood eatery in 1965.

The restaurant, a casual dining establishment, is located on the Miles River. The restaurant serves beer, including Crab Claw Ale, and relies heavily on Old Bay Seasoning, a local spice blend. The skipjack H.M. Krentz departs from the restaurant's dock on daily excursions.

The Crab Claw was featured on Food TV's Fabulous Summer Fun and in Paula Deen's May 2010 issue. It was awarded "Best Maryland Crab Cakes" by Southern Living Magazine.

See also
 List of seafood restaurants

References

Seafood restaurants in Maryland
Saint Michaels, Maryland
Restaurants established in 1965
1965 establishments in Maryland